Pedro Jesús Mora Suescun (born 20 September 1977) is a Venezuelan long-distance runner. At the 2012 Summer Olympics, he competed in the Men's marathon, finishing in 62nd place.

Personal bests
10,000m: 29:49.0 min (ht) –  Caracas, 20 March 2009
Half marathon: 1:03:37 hrs –  Neiva, 26 May 2001
Marathon: 2:14:42 hrs –  Duluth, Minnesota, 18 April 2011

Achievements

References

External links

Sports reference biography
Tilastopaja biography

Venezuelan male marathon runners
Living people
Olympic athletes of Venezuela
Athletes (track and field) at the 2012 Summer Olympics
1977 births
Venezuelan male long-distance runners
People from Táchira
20th-century Venezuelan people
21st-century Venezuelan people